Joseph Raya (15 August 1916 – 10 June 2005) was a Lebanese-born Melkite Catholic archbishop, theologian, civil rights advocate.

He served as metropolitan of Akko, Haifa, Nazareth and All Galilee from 1968 until 1974 and was particularly known for his commitment to seeking reconciliation between Christians, Jews and Muslims. He was also a leading advocate of celebrating the Divine Liturgy in vernacular languages.

Life

Early life
Joseph-Marie Raya was born to Almez and Mikhail Raya of Zahle and was the seventh of eight children. After finishing his elementary education at the Oriental College he studied in Paris before entering St. Anne's seminary in Jerusalem in 1937. He was ordained a priest of the Melkite Catholic Church on 20 July 1941. He later taught at the Patriarchal College on Queen Nazli Street in Cairo. Raya was expelled from Egypt in 1948 by King Farouk for defending the rights of women. He emigrated to the United States in 1949.

Birmingham and the civil rights movement
After serving as assistant pastor of St. Ann's Melkite Catholic Church in Woodland Park, New Jersey, he was appointed pastor of St. George Melkite Greek Catholic Church in Birmingham, Alabama, in 1952. His championing civil rights brought him into close friendship with Rev. Martin Luther King Jr. Raya marched several times at King's side and suffered three times at the hands of the Ku Klux Klan, including one occasion when he was kidnapped and severely beaten by three Klansmen.  Defying the threat of excommunication issued by Roman Catholic Archbishop Thomas Toolen, Raya helped King and other civil rights demonstrators organize protests and marches throughout Alabama during the 1960s. Raya went on to found Saint Moses the Black Mission, the first Eastern Catholic mission for African Americans, located in downtown Birmingham.

He was also very close to social justice activist Catherine Doherty, and he became the first Associate Priest of her Madonna House Apostolate in Combermere, Ontario, Canada, on July 1, 1959. When he became Archbishop of Nazareth he ordained her husband Eddie Doherty to the priesthood.

Advocate of the vernacular for liturgical services
As a priest in Alabama, Raya advocated for younger generations to have church services in their own languages, and translated the Gospels, Missal, and Byzantine Divine Liturgy into English. Raya created a controversy when he invited Bishop Fulton J. Sheen, the famous television Catholic personality,  to celebrate the Pontifical Byzantine Divine Liturgy in English in 1958 at the Melkite National Convention. Bishop Sheen celebrated the Liturgy in English on television, inspiring some Catholics to renew calls for widespread use of the vernacular but raising the ire of traditionalists.

The Roman Catholic archbishop of Mobile, Alabama, Thomas Toolen, banned Raya from celebrating the Divine Liturgy in English in December 1959. However, Pope John XXIII intervened in March 1960 at the request of Melkite Patriarch Maximos IV Sayegh to decide the question in favor of the Byzantine custom of celebrating the Divine Mysteries in the vernacular. In 1963 Raya's liturgical translation was declared the official English translation for the Catholic Byzantine rites.

Patriarch Maximos IV recognized Raya's successes by elevating him to the dignity of Grand Archimandrite of Jerusalem and appointing him a member of the Melkite patriarchal delegation to the Second Vatican Council. In a significant break with tradition, the church fathers of Vatican II decided to allow widespread use of vernacular in the Catholic Church. After completing his work at Vatican II Raya continued to translate Melkite works into English. In 1968, with Baron Jose de Vinck of Alleluia Press in New Jersey, he authored Byzantine Daily Worship, a compendium in English of the Divine Liturgy, Office of the Hours, and the sacraments.

Episcopate
Following his appointment as archbishop of Akko, Haifa, Nazareth and All Galilee on October 20, 1968, Archbishop Joseph led a peaceful demonstration of thousands of Arabs and Jews in Israel seeking justice for the villages of Kafr Bir'im and Iqrit in Upper Galilee that had been depopulated in 1948, and then destroyed. Iqrit was the hometown of his second successor, Archbishop Elias Chacour. He sought justice through non-violent means and called upon Palestinians to be good citizens of Israel.

Describing Raya's actions, Father John Catoir wrote in 1969:

In August, 1972 he ordered all churches in his eparchy closed one Sunday to mourn for "the death of justice in Israel" as the two villages remained dispossessed. Explaining his position, Raya said:

As archbishop, Raya was a controversial figure. While many admired his charismatic style and ecumenical leadership, some Arabs and members of the church hierarchy resented his overtures to Israel. Raya was opposed to the Melkite Holy Synod's proposal to internationalize Jerusalem. He also upset the Vatican with his aggressive campaign for the return of the Bir'im and Ikrit refugees and the sale of church land to impoverished Muslim farmers. Raya's letter of resignation declared that the Church hierarchy forced his decision to leave his post. The government of Israel considered him dangerous, but when he resigned Prime Minister Golda Meir begged him to reconsider.

Raya's resignation came as a shock to many. The local Christian Youth Club collected several thousand signatures asking him to reconsider, and prominent Muslim, Jewish and Christian leaders in Israel and abroad voiced disappointment. Yoram Kaniuk described their thoughts on the archbishop, describing Raya as "incomprehensible. The great majority of people viewed him with suspicion. Because he failed to conform to generally accepted notions ... Unusual people, deeply religious men, men of morals we won't understand. Bishop Raya was out of step. He bore Israel no animosity. He cared for and looked after his spiritual flock." Departing his post, Raya used his final pastoral letter to underscore his ecumenical approach:

After resigning his archbishopric on 13 July 1974, Raya moved to Madonna House in Combermere, Ontario, Canada. At some time between his resignation and 1975 he suffered a massive heart attack and had a quadruple bypass operation in Lexington, Kentucky. From his home in Combermere he lectured and wrote on Byzantine spirituality at various places, among them Fordham University's John XXIII Ecumenical Center in The Bronx and the Patriarchal Major Seminary at Raboue in Antelias, Lebanon. He returned to Lebanon in 1985 to assist the Diocese of Beirut with Archbishop Habib Bacha. In 1987 he assumed interim leadership of the Archdiocese of Banias in Marjayoun, Lebanon, which had been destroyed by the 1974 − 1991 Lebanese civil war. He moved back to Canada after the completion of this assignment and retired at Madonna House in 1990. Raya died on 10 June 2005, at St. Francis Memorial Hospital in Barry's Bay, Ontario, Canada.

Personal life 
Raya had a close friendship with Francis Martin, a Roman Catholic theologian.

Books and publications by Joseph Raya

Raya authored several books, including hymnals, theological works, and monographs on church history. Most of his publications were written in English. They include:

See also
Melkite Greek Catholic Church
Archbishop of Nazareth
Gregory III Laham
Elias Chacour
Madonna House Apostolate

References
 Sabada, Lesya. Go To The Deep: The Life of Archbishop Joseph Raya. Newton, MA: Sophia Press, 2006.

Notes

External links
Biography of Archbishop Joseph Raya on Madonna House web site
Books by Archbishop Joseph Raya at Madonna  House Publications
Video clip of Archbishop Raya leading a peaceful protest, 1972-08-14
Obituary of Joseph Raya

1916 births
2005 deaths
Activists for African-American civil rights
American Eastern Catholics
Civil rights activists
Lebanese writers
Lebanese Melkite Greek Catholics
Melkite Greek Catholic bishops
American Melkite Greek Catholic bishops
Religious leaders from Birmingham, Alabama
Participants in the Second Vatican Council
Lebanese emigrants to the United States
Activists from Birmingham, Alabama
20th-century American clergy